The Russia national badminton team represents Russia in international badminton competitions. The team is organized by the National Badminton Federation of Russia (NBFR) located in Moscow. The NBFR became the sport's sole administrator when the Russian Badminton Federation (RBF) was dissolved by the Russian Olympic Committee (ROC) in 2005.

In light of the 2022 Russian invasion of Ukraine, Badminton World Federation (BWF) banned Russian athletes and officials from tournaments. It also cancelled all BWF-sanctioned events in Russia, and banned all Russian national flags and symbols from being displayed at any BWF-sanctioned event.

Summer Olympic Games

List of medalists

Record

As Soviet Union

Participation in European Junior Team Badminton Championships
Mixed Team

Players
According to the BWF World Ranking, the top players as of September 7, 2021 were:

Men's singles
73. Sergey Sirant

82. Vladimir Malkov (badminton)

155. Georgii Karpov

Men's doubles
14. Vladimir Ivanov (badminton) / Ivan Sozonov

110. Vladimir Nikulov / Artem Serpionov

115. Denis Grachev (badminton) / Pavel Kotsarenko

Mixed doubles
20. Rodion Alimov / Alina Davletova

52. Evgenij Dremin / Evgenia Dimova

Women's singles
22. Evgeniya Kosetskaya

65. Natalia Perminova

194. Anastasiia Semenova

Women's doubles
33. Ekaterina Malkova / Alina Davletova

38. Anastasiia Akchurina / Olga Morozova (badminton)

References

External links
National Badminton Federation of Russia

National badminton teams
Badminton in Russia
B